Talil (also Romanized as Ţalīl) is a village in Hoveyzeh Rural District, in the Central District of Hoveyzeh County, Khuzestan Province, Iran. At the 2006 census, its population was 157, in 22 families.

References 

Populated places in Hoveyzeh County